Andrew Goodman may refer to:

 Andrew Goodman (activist) (1943–1964), American social worker and activist
 Andrew Goodman (rugby union) (born 1982), New Zealand rugby union player

See also
 Andrew Goldman (born 1965), American Olympic sailor
 André Goodman (born 1978), American football player